The Diablo Valley refers to a valley in the East Bay of the San Francisco Bay Area, to the west/northwest of Mount Diablo.  The valley contains the cities of Clayton, Concord, Martinez, Pleasant Hill (home to Diablo Valley College), most of Walnut Creek (The southern end is a part of the San Ramon Valley) and the CDP of Pacheco. The Diablo Valley has a diverse population both ethnically, and socio-economically. West of the Diablo Valley lies the Briones Regional Park and the Lamorinda area.

References

Valleys of Contra Costa County, California
Landforms of the San Francisco Bay Area
Valleys of California